Marianne & Leonard: Words of Love is a 2019 documentary film directed by Nick Broomfield, about the relationship between writer and singer Leonard Cohen and his "muse" Marianne Ihlen, in particular their time spent on the Greek island of Hydra in the 1960s and 1970s. She was the inspiration behind "So Long, Marianne", "Hey, That's No Way to Say Goodbye" and "Bird on the Wire."

Release
The film premiered at the 2019 Sundance Film Festival.

Critical reception 
Critical reaction is generally positive. On Rotten Tomatoes the film has an approval rating of  based on reviews from  critics. The site's critical consensus reads, "It suffers from a somewhat one-sided approach, but Marianne & Leonard: Words of Love is an absorbing glimpse of a fascinating chapter of its subjects' lives." On Metacritic the film has a weighted average score of 69 based on reviews from 19 critics, indicating "generally favorable reviews."

The Guardian gave it 4 stars out of 5, calling it a "tender, vivid snapshot of a singer and his 'muse'." The Irish Independent gave it 4 stars as well, saying "Broomfield’s film has an unhurried, digressive style that seems oddly appropriate to its dreamy, quasi-mythical story. But he sentimentalises neither Leonard nor Susanne, and makes it clear that there was a downside to Hydra’s carefree hedonism." RogerEbert.com awarded it 2½ stars out of 4, and said "The strongest aspect of "Marianne and Leonard" has nothing to do with Ihlen or Cohen, but is the vivid picture painted of the 1960s counterculture, particularly its manifestation on Hydra."

The New Statesman said that the film "romanticises a sexist trope" and that Broomfield "falls into the same trap as Cohen, rendering Ihlen into nothing more than the play-thing of a male artist." Empire Online awarded it 2 out of 5, saying "Words Of Love claims to honour a love story between a man and a woman, one that transcends creative differences and the weariness of time. But through scattershot interviews with friends and collaborators, it feels more like a half-hearted biopic about Cohen throughout his tumultuous career – with a bit of intimate gossip intercut here and there."

References

External links
 Official site
 
 

Leonard Cohen
2019 films
2019 documentary films
Black-and-white documentary films
Documentary films about poets
Documentary films about singers
Documentary films about sexuality
Greek documentary films
Canadian documentary films
American documentary films
Films shot in Hydra
2010s American films
2010s Canadian films